Chungdam High School is a public high school located in Apgujeong-dong, Gangnam-gu, Seoul, South Korea. It was opened in 1990.

Notable alumni

Bang Chan
Choi Hyun-suk of Treasure
Lee Dae-hwi
Nam Da-won
Park Ji-hyo

Kim Jong-in
Son Na-eun
Peniel Shin

Kim Tae-yeon
Choi Soo-young
Lee Sun-mi
Lee Tae-min
Kim Seung-min
Kim Woo-jin
Kang Young-hyun

Kim Jennie

References

External links 
 Archived Official Website

High schools in Seoul
Educational institutions established in 1990
1990 establishments in South Korea